Bismuth(III) acetate is an ionic salt composed of positive bismuth ions and negative acetate ions. The bismuth ions have a charge of 3+, while the acetate ions have a charge of 1-.  Therefore, the empirical formula for bismuth(III) acetate is Bi1(AOC)3.

See also
Magnesium acetate
Bismuth(III) oxide

References

Bismuth compounds
Acetates